Ann Bates (c. 1748 – c. 1801) was a loyalist spy during the American Revolution. Originally from Philadelphia, Pennsylvania, Bates was known for her awareness, her intelligence, and her ability to remain calm under pressure. She was commonly referred to as "Mrs. Barnes" by affiliates in her spy networks. She was known to carry an unknown unique token that would eventually identify her as a British spy.  She would go on to become a part of British General Clinton's espionage network, and would help the British combat American forces on several fronts. She reportedly took part in various clandestine spy missions between 1778 and 1780. Bates was most well known for her missions completed at George Washington's base camp in White Plains, New York, and during the Rhode Island campaign or the Battle of Rhode Island.

Personal life
Ann Bates was reportedly born around 1748 in Pennsylvania. Before becoming a spy, she was a schoolteacher in Philadelphia. To supplement her income as a school teacher, she also kept bees, raised sheep, and ran a small store. She was married to Joseph Bates, who was a soldier and  artillery repairman for the British Army. Joseph Bates enlisted under General Clinton of the British army during British evacuation from Philadelphia in 1778. The army then marched to New York City, where Bates received her spy training. Although loyalists were often punished through persecution, beatings, tarring, or destruction of property, Bates never suffered any of these casualties. This was likely due to her low profile, and the respect she maintained amongst her neighbors regardless of the volatile political climate in Philadelphia at the time.

Career
Ann Bates used her resourcefulness and wit to eventually become a great spy.  Because women were generally understood to be uneducated about wartime strategy and armaments during the Revolution, she was able to go un-noticed in American camps.  While in hiding, she disguised herself as a peddler and freely traveled amongst the American soldiers. She is most well known for her spy expeditions at George Washington's camp in White Plains, New York.

Entering the spy ring
Ann Bates was first discovered by a civilian-spy, John Craig, or "Craiggie". The two met sometime during British occupation in Philadelphia. Craig was an active member in Clinton's espionage network, and assigned Bates with small secret tasks while they were still in Philadelphia.  Craig quickly noticed her intelligence, and referred her to meet with his general, Major Duncan Drummond, in New York City. She would then go on to flee Philadelphia on June 18, 1778, when British commander General Clinton evacuated his forces from the capital. General Clinton added Major John Andre as an aide and commander of his intelligence coordination, this is where Ann Bates became a member of Major Andre's spy ring. This was in response to news of an alliance between France and the United States. As the political climate was changing, Bates was one of many loyalists who left Philadelphia with the British Army. She swiftly left the capital after convincing the General at the time,  Benedict Arnold, that she was leaving to sell her goods in New York City.  After her husband joined Clinton's army on June 18, 1778, Bates followed the British to their headquarters in New York City. After she arrived at headquarters to meet with Craig, she was surprised to meet with one of Clinton's main spy handlers, Duncan Drummond, instead. The two persuaded Bates to join the British spy network. He was recorded describing their meeting; "A woman whom Craig has trusted often came to town last night. She is well acquainted with many of the R.A. (Royal Army)... It is proposed to send her out under the idea of selling little matters".

Washington's camp and the Rhode Island Campaign

On June 29, 1778, Bates left New York City for her first mission after only one day of training. She subsequently traveled to Washington's camp in White Plains, New York under the name "Mrs. Barnes". Because she was familiar with the artillery used during the Revolution, she was able to relay valuable information about the Americans' materials and strategy. Initially, Bates' mission was to find a disloyal soldier in Washington's camp who could give the British intelligence some potential intel, but she was unsuccessful in that mission. She then changed her mission while at the camp, and listened in on many conversations and counted artillery pieces on the camp. At George Washington's camp in White Plains, American troops were planning the Rhode Island Campaign. She recorded valuable intelligence on American movement into Rhode Island.

On her way back to New York City after her first mission, she was stopped at an American patrol stop four miles from White Plains for unknown reasons, and arrested at the check-point due to suspicion. Bates remained in confinement overnight, but was released the next morning. Once she finally returned to New York City, she relayed the vast information that she was able to gather to Major Drummond. She reported that American weapons were far more scarce than the British had originally believed them to be. General Drummond was impressed with her work, her memory, and her capabilities. Although Bates had just undergone a stressful mission, she was eager to return to White Plains again.  She totaled three trips to the camp, and relayed information necessary for the British troops to combat American military efforts in the Battle of Rhode Island. In her third mission, she noted that 600 boats were being prepared to attack Long Island. Bates was able to give specific and important intelligence about the number of troops that were heading to attack British forces stationed in Long Island.

In September 1778, when she was on another mission infiltrating Washington’s army, a deserter from the British Twenty-Seventh Regiment recognized her, but she was able to elude capture. She then went on to travel through a series of safe houses that were designed for women spies at the time.  She later wrote, "I had the Opportunity of going through their whole Army Remarking at the same time the strength & Situation of each Brigade, & the Number of Cannon with their Situation and Weight of Ball each Cannon was Charged with".

New Jersey and capture
During her final mission in White Plains, Ann Bates came across a former British soldier, a defector, who she suspected would report her after seeing her. She had recognized him from an earlier mission, and immediately left the American camp. She fled directly back to New York, and while doing so, cut straight through New Jersey. While traveling throughout that state, Bates stayed in Tory safe houses throughout the state. She wrote of the safe houses, "where I might be accommodated through the Jerseys." The expansive network of Loyalist safe houses throughout mid Atlantic proved to be effective. Many British prisoners were able to escape American camps from Virginia, up the east coast due to the effectiveness of the safe houses.

Bates wanted to get back to British lines as quickly as possible, for fear that her cover would be blown. On Saturday, September 26, 1778, on her way back to New York City,  she was discovered at an American headquarters. The American unit had over 5,000 troops, and was under the command of General Charles Scott. General Scott was Washington's Chief of Intelligence, and was on the lookout for British counter-intelligence. Bates was detained and taken to Scott who questioned her. Bates told Scott that she "was a Soldier's wife in the Centre Division & had forgot something about five or six Miles below the Plains." Bates eventually was let go, but she was rattled by the occurrences, and suspicion that she was beginning to garner. After she returned to New York City and delivered information to Major Drummond, Drummond took her to Long Island with him for fear of her running into American forces again. A few days later they returned to Manhattan and Drummond asked her to meet with a friend of Benedict Arnold's within a 47-mile radius of Philadelphia. This displays Benedict Arnold's early involvement with the Tory intelligence network.

British advancement to Charleston
Between October 1778 and August 1779, Bates did not have any participation in Clinton's spy espionage network. This was due to Clinton sending Drummond back to England due to a disagreement between the two. Major John André went on to take Drummond's place. André was most well known for his collaboration with well-known American traitor, Benedict Arnold. In April 1780, her husband, Joseph Bates, was sent to Charleston, South Carolina to siege the city. Bates traveled with him there, but refrained from taking part in any further spy networking while in Charleston. An old friend, British Colonel Nisbet Balfour called for Bates' assistance in operating a spy ring out of Charleston.  While there were plans for her to aid in General Cornwallis' mission to siege Charleston, both missions were aborted.

Legacy
On March 6, 1781, Ann Bates and her husband sailed for England. 
She is remembered as a well-connected, intelligent, and integral spy for the Loyalist army during the American Revolution. Her busy career and the family's economic distress put a strain on her marriage, and Joseph left her soon after they arrived in England. Regardless, Bates took pride in her role after the war was over, and wrote a petition for a pension in 1785. The petition stated, "my timely information as the blessed means of saving the Rhode Island garrison with all the troops and stores who must otherwise have fallen a prey to their enemies". She contacted Major Duncan Drummond to assist her in securing a pension from the British government for her services during the American Revolution.

Major Drummond's personal papers, official government documents, and her memory secured her a pension. Bates' date of death was not recorded, but it is suspected that she died in England.

Ann Bates is portrayed by Tina Benko in the AMC TV series, Turn: Washington's Spies.

See also 
 Women in the American Revolution
 Loyalists fighting in the American Revolution
 Intelligence in the American Revolutionary War
 Intelligence operations in the American Revolutionary War
 Miss Jenny
 Agent 355
 Lydia Darragh

References

Bibliography
 McBurney, Christian M. Spies in Revolutionary Rhode Island. Charleston, SC: History, 2014.
 McBurney, Christian M. "Ann Bates: British Spy Extraordinaire." Journal of the American Revolution. December 1, 2014. https://allthingsliberty.com/2014/12/ann-bates-british-spy-extraordinaire/
 Misencik, Paul R. The Original American Spies-Seven Covert Agents Of The Revolutionary War. North Carolina: McFarland Publishing, 2013.
 MacLean, Maggie. "Ann Bates." History of American Women. July 4, 2011. http://www.womenhistoryblog.com/2011/07/ann-bates.html
 "Women Spies - Ann Bates." Women Spies - Ann Bates. University of Michigan: Clements Library, n.d. Web. 29 Nov. 2016.

Further reading
 Misencik, Paul R. The Original American Spies-Seven Covert Agents Of The Revolutionary War. North Carolina: McFarland Publishing, 2013.
 McBurney, Christian M. Spies in Revolutionary Rhode Island. Charleston, SC: History, 2014.
 Berkin, Carol. Revolutionary Mothers: Women in the Struggle for America's Independence. 2005.
 Jay Robert Nash. Spies: A narrative encyclopedia of dirty deeds and double dealing from biblical times to today. New York: M. Evans and Co., 1997.

Female wartime spies
Women in the American Revolution
Year of death missing
Year of birth uncertain
British spies during the American Revolution